William McCurdy may refer to:
 William McCurdy II, American politician in Nevada
 William F. McCurdy, merchant and political figure in Nova Scotia, Canada